Muggenhof station is a Nuremberg U-Bahn station, located on the U1.

References

Nuremberg U-Bahn stations
Railway stations in Germany opened in 1982
Buildings and structures completed in 1982
1982 establishments in West Germany